Thomas M. Kingston (born 9 September 1967) is an Irish retired hurler who played as a goalkeeper for the Cork senior team.

Born in Tracton, County Cork, Kingston first arrived on the inter-county scene at the age of sixteen when he first linked up with the Cork minor team, before later joining the under-21 and junior sides. He joined the senior panel during the 1965 championship. Kingston was sub-goalkeeper for a number of seasons and won one All-Ireland medal, two Munster medals and one National Hurling League medal as a non-playing substitute. He was an All-Ireland runner-up on one occasion.

At club level he is a one-time championship medallist in the intermediate grade with Tracton.

His brother, Kieran Kingston, was also an All-Ireland medallist with Cork.

Kingston's retirement came following the conclusion of the 1994 championship.

In retirement from playing Kingston became involved in team management and coaching. He has been a selector at club level with Tracton and also with University College Cork.

Playing career

Club

Having lost the championship decider to St. Finbarr's in the intermediate grade in 1990, Tracton reached the final for a second consecutive year in 1991. A narrow 4-14 to 5-9 defeat of Inniscarra gave Kingston an intermediate championship medal.

Inter-county

Minor, under-21 and junior

Kingston first played for Cork as a member of the minor hurling team on 2 May 1984 in a 4-11 to 3-12 Munster semi-final defeat by Limerick.

In 1985 Kingston enjoyed his biggest successes with the Cork minor hurlers. He won a Munster medal following a 1-13 to 1-8 defeat of Tipperary. On 1 September 1985 Cork faced Wexford in the All-Ireland decider. The 3-10 to 0-12 victory brought an end to a six-year losing streak and gave Kingston an All-Ireland Minor Hurling Championship medal.

Kingston's performances at minor level saw him drafted onto the under-21 panel as sub-goalie for the unsuccessful 1985 campaign.

After being involved as a non-playing substitute with the Cork junior team in 1986, he was installed as a member of the starting fifteen the following year. A 2-16 to 1-9 defeat of Tipperary gave him a Munster medal. On 25 July 1987 Cork faced Wexford in the subsequent All-Ireland decider. Cork were trailing as the game entered the final moments, however, a comeback and a last minute point from Raymond O'Connor secured a 3-11 to 2-13 victory and an All-Ireland medal for Kingston.

In 1988 Kingston was first-choice goalkeeper on the Cork under-21 team. He won a Munster medal that year following a 4-12 to 1-7 trouncing of Limerick. On 11 September 1988 Cork faced Kilkenny in the All-Ireland decider. The match was played at O'Connor Park in Birr to mark the centenary of the very first All-Ireland final which was played in the town. Cork had a relatively easy 4-11 to 1-5 victory over Kilkenny, giving Kingston an All-Ireland medal in that grade.

Senior

In 1990 Kingston was added to the Cork senior hurling panel as understudy to regular goalkeeper Ger Cunningham. A 4-16 to 2-14 defeat of reigning provincial and All-Ireland champions secured a first Munster medal as a sub for Kingston. On 2 September 1990 Cork faced Galway in the All-Ireland decider and Kingston was on the bench once again. Cork went on to win a high-scoring and open game of hurling by 5-15 to 2-21, giving Kingston an All-Ireland medal.

Kingston claimed a second Munster medal as a non-playing substitute in 1992 as Cork secured a 1-22 to 3-11 defeat of Limerick. On 6 September 1992 Cork faced Kilkenny in the All-Ireland decider. Kingston remained on the bench for the entire game as "the Cats" claimed a 3-10 to 1-12 victory.

In 1993 Kingston was between the posts for the National League decider with Wexford. A 2-11 apiece draw was the result on that occasion, with Ger Cunningham resuming as 'keeper for the replay. Another drawn game necessitated a replay which Cork won by 3-11 to 1-12. Kingtson collected a National Hurling League medal as a non-playing substitute.

After an unsuccessful championship campaign in 1994, Kingston was replaced as sub goalkeeper by Ian Lynam.

Honours

Player

Tracton
Cork Intermediate Hurling Championship (1): 1991

Cork
All-Ireland Senior Hurling Championship (1): 1990 (sub)
Munster Senior Hurling Championship (2): 1990 (sub), 1992 (sub)
National Hurling League (1): 1992-93 (sub)
All-Ireland Junior Hurling Championship (1): 1987
Munster Junior Hurling Championship (1): 1987
All-Ireland Under-21 Hurling Championship (1): 1988
Munster Under-21 Hurling Championship (1): 1988
All-Ireland Minor Hurling Championship (1): 1985
Munster Minor Hurling Championship (1): 1985

References

1967 births
Living people
Tracton hurlers
Cork inter-county hurlers
Hurling selectors